Śmiłowice may refer to:
Polish name for Smilovice (Frýdek-Místek District) in the Czech Republic
Śmiłowice, Kuyavian-Pomeranian Voivodeship (north-central Poland)
Śmiłowice, Lesser Poland Voivodeship (south Poland)
Śmiłowice, Opole Voivodeship (south-west Poland)
Śmiłowice, Mikołów in Silesian Voivodeship (south Poland)